Allah-o-Akbar Tehreek (AAT) is a political party in Pakistan led by Dr. Mian Ihsan Bari. Its election symbol is a chair.

2018 General Elections 
It emerged as the 12th largest political party by securing 172,120 (0.32%)  votes but it failed to  get any seat in 2018 general elections.

Controversy 
It is believed to have a political connection with the Milli Muslim League whose registration has been rejected several times by Election Commission of Pakistan due to having its affiliation with  Jama'at-ud-Da'wah's Hafiz Saeed. It fielded most of the candidates of Milli Muslim League but failed to get any seat in 2018 general elections.

Electoral history

See also 
Milli Muslim League

References

External links 

Political parties in Pakistan